Adriana Asti (born 30 April 1931) is an Italian stage, film, and voice actress.

Biography
On stage, she starred in Saint Joan by George Bernard Shaw, Happy Days by Samuel Beckett, The Mistress of the Inn by Carlo Goldoni, and Three Men for Amalia. She won the SIAE prize in 1990, and the Duse prize in 1993. In 1999, she wrote and starred in Alcohol. In 2000, she starred in French Ferdinand.

Personal life
She was first married to Bernardo Bertolucci.

Selected filmography

 
Arrangiatevi!, by Mauro Bolognini (1959)
Rocco and His Brothers, by Luchino Visconti (1960)
Accattone, by Pier Paolo Pasolini (1961)
Il disordine, by Franco Brusati (1962)
Before the Revolution, by Bernardo Bertolucci (1964)
I visionari, by Maurizio Ponzi (1968)
Più tardi, Claire, più tardi, by Brunello Rondi (1968)
Metti una sera a cena, by Giuseppe Patroni Griffi (1969)
Homo Eroticus, by Marco Vicario (1971)
La schiava io ce l'ho e tu no, by Giorgio Capitani (1972)
I Nicotera, TV miniseries by Salvatore Nocita (1972)
Ludwig, by Luchino Visconti (1972)
The Sensual Man, by Marco Vicario (1973)
Amore e ginnastica, by Luigi Filippo D'Amico (1973)
A Brief Vacation, by Vittorio De Sica (1973)
Le fantôme de la liberté, by Luis Buñuel (1974)
Down the Ancient Staircase, by Mauro Bolognini (1975)
The Inheritance, by Mauro Bolognini (1976)
Maschio latino cercasi, by Giovanni Narzisi (1977)
Caligula, by Tinto Brass (1980)
Action, by Tinto Brass (1980)
Petomaniac, by Pasquale Festa Campanile (1983)
Chimère, by Claire Devers (1989)
Who Killed Pasolini?, by Marco Tullio Giordana (1995)
The Best of Youth, by Marco Tullio Giordana (2003)
Once You're Born You Can No Longer Hide, by Marco Tullio Giordana (2005)
Impardonnables, by André Téchiné (2011)
Pasolini, by Abel Ferrara (2014)

Awards and nominations

References

External links
 

1931 births
Living people
Actresses from Milan
Italian film actresses
Italian stage actresses
Nastro d'Argento winners
Ciak d'oro winners
20th-century Italian actresses